Stoltenberg's Second Cabinet was the Government of Norway from 17 October 2005 to 16 October 2013. It was a coalition between the Labour Party, the Socialist Left Party and the Centre Party, known as the Red–Green Coalition. On 9 September 2013, the coalition was defeated in the 2013 election.
 
The cabinet had ten members from the Labour Party, five from the Socialist Left Party and four from the Centre Party. It replaced Bondevik's Second Cabinet following the 2005 parliamentary election where the three parties won a majority in parliament. In the 2009 parliamentary election, the three parties retained their majority, and the coalition continued.

The cabinet is the first time the Socialist Left Party has sat in government, and the second time, after the post-war interim Gerhardsen's First Cabinet, where the Labour Party sits in a coalition government. It was the first cabinet to have had a majority of women, the first to have had a member with a non-Western heritage and the first to have had a member who was a Muslim.

Replacements

There have been several changes since Prime Minister Jens Stoltenberg presented his first team in October 2005:
 On 29 September 2006, Odd Eriksen resigned as Minister of Trade and Industry, and was succeeded by Dag Terje Andersen.
 On 21 September 2007, Odd Roger Enoksen resigned as Minister of Petroleum and Energy and was replaced by Åslaug Haga, who was succeeded as Minister of Local Government and Regional Development by Magnhild Meltveit Kleppa, thus making the first government in the history of Norway with more women than men.
 On 18 October 2007, Helen Bjørnøy resigned as Minister of Environment and Øystein Djupedal as Minister of Education and Science. Fellow Socialist Left Party minister Erik Solheim became joint Minister of International Development and Environment (though the two roles were not merged, International Development is part of the Ministry of Foreign Affairs), while Djupedal was succeeded by Bård Vegard Solhjell as Minister of Education and Tora Aasland as Minister of Science. Karita Bekkemellem resigned as Minister of Children and Equality and was replaced by Norway's first minister with a minority background, Manuela Ramin-Osmundsen.
 On 15 February 2008, Ramin-Osmundsen was forced to resign following the strong criticism she faced after withholding information and lying to the Prime Minister on a possible conflict of interest in appointing a new children's ombudsman. Anniken Huitfeldt was appointed new minister on 29 February 2008.
 On 20 June 2008, Åslaug Haga resigned as Minister of Petroleum and Energy citing health problems following press revelations about a building violations scandal. The resignation led to a major reshuffle. Haga was replaced as Minister of Petroleum and Energy by Terje Riis-Johansen, who was himself replaced as Minister of Agriculture and Food by member of parliament and fellow Centre Party politician Lars Peder Brekk. Among the Labour Party ministers, Dag Terje Andersen moved to the Ministry of Labour and Social Inclusion and was replaced as Minister of Industry and Trade by Sylvia Brustad. Her former Ministry of Health and Care Services was taken by Bjarne Håkon Hanssen.
 On 2 October 2009, Dag Terje Andersen resigned as Minister of Labour and Social Inclusion to become President of the Storting and Helga Pedersen as Minister of Fisheries and Coastal Affairs to become parliamentary leader for the Labour party in the Storting.
 Following the re-election of the Government, the Prime Minister on 20 October 2009 presented a new cabinet with several changes. The election strengthened the Labour party, while weakening the Socialist Left party, and the latter thus handed over one ministry to the former. They also gave up the Ministry of Finance for the Ministry of Children, Equality and Social inclusion. Another change in the composition of the government was the promotion of Karl Eirik Schjøtt-Pedersen from state secretary to Minister at the Office of the Prime Minister, thus adding to the number of ministers. In the Labour party, Minister of Health and Care Services Bjarne Håkon Hanssen and Minister of Trade and Industry Sylvia Brustad, both resigned from politics. The health portfolio was given to Anne-Grete Strøm-Erichsen, who was succeeded as Minister of Defence by Grete Faremo. The Trade and Industry portfolio was given to Trond Giske, who was succeeded as Minister of Culture by Anniken Huitfeldt (while the church portfolio was moved to the Ministry of Government Administration and Reform). Her former Ministry of Children of Equality was handed to the new Socialist Left party chairman Audun Lysbakken, who also took the portfolio of social inclusion.  The former Socialist Left party chairman Kristin Halvorsen left the Ministry of Finance to become new Minister of Education, while the incumbent of that ministry, Bård Vegar Solhjell, resigned from the government to become parliamentary leader for the Socialist Left party in the Storting. Sigbjørn Johnsen became new Minister of Finance for the Labour party. The Ministry of Government Administration and Reform received the church portfolio, and Labour party MP Rigmor Aasrud was appointed minister. The outgoing Socialist Left party minister, Heidi Grande Røys, resigned from politics. To fill the vacancies left by the post-election (2 October) resignations of Andersen as Minister of Labour, and Pedersen as Minister of Fisheries and Coastal Affairs, new Labour party ministers were Lisbeth Berg-Hansen and Hanne Bjurstrøm. The Centre party kept their ministers, but there was a switch of ministries. Party leader Liv Signe Navarsete became Minister for Local Government and Regional Development, while Magnhild Meltveit Kleppa took Navarsete's former Ministry of Transport and Communications.
 On 4 March 2011, Terje Riis-Johansen resigned as Minister of Petroleum and Energy and was replaced by Ola Borten Moe.
 On 11 November 2011, Knut Storberget resigned as Minister of Justice, stating he wanted to spend more time with his children after troubling months following the 2011 Norway attacks. He was replaced by Grete Faremo, who was succeeded as Minister of Defence by Espen Barth Eide.
 On 5 March 2012, Audun Lysbakken left the government as Minister of Children, Equality and Social Inclusion and was replaced by Kristin Halvorsen until further notice
 On 23 March 2012, Erik Solheim and Tora Aasland retired. Both education portfolios were put under the responsibility of Halvorsen. Inga Marte Thorkildsen was appointed Minister of Children, Equality and Social Inclusion; Heikki Holmås was appointed Minister of International Development; and Solhjell was appointed Minister of the Environment.
 On 18 June 2012, Magnhild Meltveit Kleppa and Lars Peder Brekk resigned. Kleppa was succeeded as Minister of Transportation and Communication by Marit Arnstad, while Brekk was succeeded as Minister of Agriculture and Food by Trygve Slagsvold Vedum.
 On 21 September 2012, Hanne Bjurstrøm resigned, and was replaced as Minister of Labour by Anniken Huitfeldt. Her former Ministry of Culture was handed to Hadia Tajik, who thus became Norway's first Muslim member of government. At the same time Jonas Gahr Støre was appointed Minister of Health and Care Services, replacing Anne-Grete Strøm-Erichsen who was re-appointed as Minister of Defence (the position she held between 2005 and 2009). The Minister of Defence, Espen Barth Eide, succeeded Gahr Støre as Minister of Foreign Affairs.

Change in ministry structure
From 1 January 2010 there was a change in the Ministry structure, following the September 2009 election and re-formation of the government. The Social Inclusion division of the Ministry of Labour and Social Inclusion was split between the Ministry of Children and Equality and the Ministry of Justice and Police. The Church Affairs division of the Ministry of Culture and Church Affairs was moved to the Ministry of Government Administration and Reform.

From 1 January 2012 the Ministry of Justice and Police was renamed as the Ministry of Justice and Emergency Planning

Cabinet members

|}

State Secretaries

References
Jens Stoltenberg's Second Government. 17 October 2005 –present – Government.no

Notes

Cabinet of Norway
Cabinets involving the Labour Party (Norway)
Cabinets involving the Centre Party (Norway)
Cabinets involving the Socialist Left Party (Norway)
2005 establishments in Norway
Cabinets established in 2005